Kung Fu Tea is an American beverage franchise headquartered in New York City, New York, United States founded in 2010. The company has over 250 locations across the U.S.

On November 30th, 2018, the company partnered with Taiwan-based restaurant chain TKK Fried Chicken to open collaborative locations in the United States. In 2021, Kung Fu Tea was recorded among Nation's Restaurant News Top 500 Restaurant Chains.

The minimum investment amount required to open a Kung Fu Tea franchise is $169,000 and can go all the way up to $378,000.

Partnerships
Kung Fu Tea has been involved in numerous brand partnerships since its inception, including Funimation and its distribution of the anime Fruits Basket, Nintendo, and miHoYo's game, Honkai Impact 3rd. The company also collaborated with clothing company Opening Ceremony (brand).

See also
Bubble tea
Tea house
Tea culture

References

External links 
 

Bubble tea brands
Tea brands in the United States
Food and drink companies based in New York City
Tea houses
Tea companies of the United States
Restaurant chains in the United States
Restaurants established in 2010